The Bishop of Mostar-Duvno is the head of the Roman Catholic Diocese of Mostar-Duvno, located in Bosnia and Herzegovina. It is responsible for looking after the diocese's spiritual and administrative needs. The Diocese of Mostar-Duvno is part of the ecclesiastical province of Vrhbosna and thus is a suffragan of that archdiocese. Since 1890, the bishops of Mostar-Duvno have also served as apostolic administrators of the Diocese of Trebinje-Mrkan. The current bishop is Petar Palić, who serves since 2020 and is the 6th ordinary.

During the Ottoman rule, the Holy See established the Apostolic Vicariate of Herzegovina in 1846. With the Austro-Hungarian occupation of Bosnia and Herzegovina in 1878, Pope Leo XIII restored the regular church hierarchy there with the papal bull Ex hac augusta on 5 July 1881, thus establishing the Diocese of Mostar-Duvno.

Six men have been bishop of Mostar-Duvno; the first two bishops were Franciscan friars – Paškal Buconjić, who served 29 years, from 1881 to 1910, and was also the last apostolic vicar of Herzegovina., and Alojzije Mišić, who served for 30 years, from 1912 to 1942. The first secular priest appointed bishop was Petar Čule who had the longest tenure of 38 years, serving from 1942 to 1980. His successor Pavao Žanić reigned for 13 years, from 1980 to 1993, marking the shortest episcopacy. His successor Ratko Perić held the episcopal office for 27 years, from 1993 to 2020, when he was succeeded by the incumbent bishop Petar Palić.

List of ordinaries

Citations

References

Journals

News articles

Websites 

 

Bishops of Mostar-Duvno
Catholic Church in Bosnia and Herzegovina
Roman Catholic bishops
Lists of Roman Catholic bishops and archbishops in Europe
Roman Catholic bishops